The Monovalent Cation (K+ or Na+):Proton Antiporter-3 (CPA3) Family (TC# 2.A.63) is a member of the Na+ transporting Mrp superfamily. The CPA3 family consists of bacterial multicomponent K+:H+ and Na+:H+ antiporters. The best characterized systems are the PhaABCDEFG system of Sinorhizobium meliloti (TC# 2.A.63.1.1) that functions in pH adaptation and as a K+ efflux system, and the MnhABCDEFG system of Staphylococcus aureus (TC# 2.A.63.1.3) that functions as a Na+ efflux Na+:H+ antiporter.

Homology 
A homologous, but only partially sequenced, system was earlier reported to catalyze Na+:H+ antiport in an alkalophilic Bacillus strain. PhaA and PhaD are respectively homologous to the ND5 and ND4 subunits of the H+-pumping NADH:ubiquinone oxidoreductase (TC #3.D.1). Homologous protein subunits from E. coli NADH:quinone oxidoreductase can functionally replace MrpA and MrpD in Bacillus subtilis.

Homologues of PhaA, B, C and D and Nha1, 2, 3 and 4 of an alkalophilic Bacillus strain are the Yuf(Mrp)T, U, V and D genes of Bacillus subtilis. In this system, YufT is believed to be responsible for Na+:H+ antiporter activity, but it does not have activity in the absence of other constituents of the operon.

Structure 
The seven Pha proteins are of the following sizes (in #aas) and exhibit the following putative numbers of transmembrane α-helical spanners (TMSs): 
 PhaA - 725 and 17
 PhaB - 257 and 5
 PhaC - 115 and 3 
 PhaD - 547 and 13 
 PhaE - 161 and 3 
 PhaF - 92 and 3 
 PhaG - 120 and 3 
All are predicted to be integral membrane proteins.

Corresponding values for the S. aureus Mnh system are: 
 MnhA - 801 and 18 
 MnhB - 142 and 4
 MnhC - 113 and 3 
 MnhD - 498 and 13
 MnhE - 159 and 4
 MnhF - 97 and 3 
 MnhG - 118 and 3 
In view of the complexity of the system, large variation in subunit structure, and the homology with NDH family protein constituents, a complicated energy coupling mechanism, possibly involving a redox reaction, cannot be ruled out.

Function 
Na+ or Li+ does, but K+, Ca2+, and Mg2+ do not, support significant antiport by the Gram-positive bacterial systems (TC# 2.A.6.3.1.2 and TC# 2.A.6.3.1.3). Na+(Li+)/H+ antiporters have alkaline pH optima and apparent Km values for Na+ that are among the lowest reported for bacterial Na+/H+ antiporters. Na+/H+antiport consumes the pmf and therefore is probably electrogenic.

YufF (MrpF) appears to catalyze cholate efflux, possibly by a Na+ symport mechanism. It plays a major role in Na+ extrusion and is required for initiation of sporulation. Additionally, another component of the operon, MrpF (equivalent to PhaF of R. meliloti) has been implicated in choline and Na+ efflux. The MrpA-G proteins of B. subtilis have been shown to be present in a single multicomponent complex. They provide Na+/H+ antiport activity and function in multiple compound resistance and pH homeostasis.

Transport Reaction 
The generalized reaction believed to be catalyzed by CPA3 family members is:[K+ or Na+] (in) + H+ (out) ⇌ [K+ or Na+] (out) + H+ (in).

See also 
 Sodium-Proton antiporter
 Monovalent Cation (K+ or Na+):Proton Antiporter-1
 Monovalent Cation (K+ or Na+):Proton Antiporter-2
 Transporter Classification Database

References 

Protein families
Membrane proteins
Transmembrane proteins
Transmembrane transporters
Transport proteins
Integral membrane proteins